Adoree may refer to:

 Angel Adoree, in the British documentary series Escape to the Chateau and Escape to the Chateau DIY
 Renée Adorée, stage name of French actress Jeanne de la Fonte (1898–1933)
 Adoree' Jackson (born 1995), American National Football League player
 Adorée Villany, stage name of a French dancer and choreographer (1891–?)